A lawyer is a person who is learned in the law.

Lawyer may also refer to:

 Lawyer (name), a masculine given name, and a surname
 Lawyer, several species of fish, including the burbot and the puddingwife wrasse
 The Bold Ones: The Lawyers, a  US TV drama
 The Lawyer,  a magazine
 The Lawyer (film), a 1970 courtroom drama film